"Out of Work" is a 1982 song by American singer Gary U.S. Bonds, from his album On the Line. The song was written by Bruce Springsteen and became a moderate hit in the United States.

In 2020, Bonds released an online version of the song tailored to the COVID-19 pandemic.

Chart performance 
"Out of Work" reached No. 21 on the Billboard Hot 100 in August 1982.  It also reached No. 10 on the Billboard Rock Tracks chart and No. 82 on the R&B chart.  In Canada, the song reached #22.

References

1982 songs
Songs written by Bruce Springsteen
Gary U.S. Bonds songs